Daya W. K. Sandagiri was the 14th Commander of the Sri Lanka Navy. Admiral Sandagiri was born in Veyangoda and had his education at St. Mary's Maha Vidyalaya, Veyangoda and Kegalu Vidyalaya, Kegalle.  He enlisted in the then Royal Ceylon Navy on 14 November 1966 and was in the first batch of naval cadets to join the Naval and Maritime Academy at Trincomalee on 1 July 1969. He was commissioned into the Executive Branch of the navy as a sub-lieutenant on 1 July 1972.

He was promoted to Commander of the Navy and served for four years and eight months in the position. Upon his retirement he was appointed Chief of the Defence Staff with the rank of admiral on 1 September 2005. He retired from that position on 12 June 2005. He became the fourth chancellor of General Sir John Kotelawala Defence University on 9 November 2015.

References

|-

|-

Sri Lankan admirals
Sinhalese military personnel
Commanders of the Navy (Sri Lanka)
1946 births
Living people